The 2017–18 Maine Black Bears women's basketball team represented the University of Maine Black Bears in the 2017–18 NCAA Division I women's basketball season. The Black Bears, led by seventh year head coach Richard Barron and interim head coach Amy Vachon, play their home games at the Cross Insurance Center with 2 games played at Memorial Gym and are members of the America East Conference. They finished the season 23–10, 15–1 in America East play to win the America East Regular Season. They also won the America East women's tournament and earned an automatic trip to the NCAA women's tournament for the first time since 2004. They lost to Texas in the first round.

Media
All home games and conference road games will stream on either ESPN3 or AmericaEast.tv. Most road games will stream on the opponents website. All games will be broadcast on the radio on WGUY and online on the Maine Portal.

Roster

Schedule

|-
!colspan=9 style="background:#; color:white;"| Exhibition

|-
!colspan=9 style="background:#; color:white;"| Non-conference regular season

|-
!colspan=9 style="background:#; color:white;"| America East regular season

|-
!colspan=9 style="background:#; color:white;"| America East Women's Tournament

|-
!colspan=9 style="background:#; color:white;"| NCAA Women's Tournament

See also
2017–18 Maine Black Bears men's basketball team

References

Maine
Maine Black Bears women's basketball seasons
Maine
Maine
Maine